Ray Middleton may refer to:

 Ray Middleton (actor) (1907–1984), American character actor
 Ray Middleton (footballer) (1919–1977), English football goalkeeper 
 Ray Middleton (racewalker) (1936–2023), British racewalker